MESM (Ukrainian: MEOM, Мала Електронна Обчислювальна Машина; Russian: МЭСМ, Малая Электронно-Счетная Машина; 'Small Electronic Calculating Machine') was the first universally programmable electronic computer in the Soviet Union. By some authors it was also depicted as the first one in continental Europe, even though the electromechanical computers Zuse Z4 and the Swedish BARK preceded it.

Overview
MESM was created by a team of scientists under the direction of Sergei Alekseyevich Lebedev from the Kiev Institute of Electrotechnology in the Ukrainian SSR, at Feofaniya (near Kyiv).

Initially, MESM was conceived as a layout or model of a Large Electronic Calculating Machine and letter "M" in the title meant "model" (prototype).

Work on the machine was research in nature, in order to experimentally test the principles of constructing universal digital computers. After the first successes and in order to meet the extensive governmental needs of computer technology, it was decided to complete the layout of a full-fledged machine capable of "solving real problems". MESM became operational in 1950. It had about 6,000 vacuum tubes and consumed 25 kW of power. It could perform approximately 3,000 operations per minute.

Creation and operation history

 Principal computer architecture scheme was ready by the end of 1949. As well as a few schematic diagrams of an individual blocks.
 In 1950 the computer was mounted in a two-story building of the former hostel of a convent in Feofania, where a psychiatric hospital was located before the second world war.
 November 6, 1950 - team performed the first test launch.  Test task is: 
 January 4, 1951. First useful calculations performed. Calculate the factorial of a number, raise number in a power. Computer was shown to special commission of the USSR State Academy of Sciences. Team was led by Mstislav Keldysh
 December 25, 1951. Official government testing passed successfully. USSR Academy of Sciences and Mstislav Keldysh began regular operation of the MESM.
 It was operated until 1957, and then transferred to Kyiv Polytechnic Institute for training purposes
 1959, MESM dismantled.

“Computer was split into pieces, which were used to build  series of stands, after all all of them was thrown away.” recalled Boris Malinovsky.

Many of the electron tubes and other components left from MESM are stored in the Foundation for the History and Development of Computer Science and Technology in the Kiev House of Scientists of the National Academy of Sciences of Ukraine.

System specification
 Arithmetic Logic Unit
 universal
 parallel action
 flip-flop based
 Number representation
 binary
 fixed points 16-n bits per number plus with one sign bit
 Instructions
 20 binary bits per command
 The first 4 bits - operation code
 The next 5 bits - first operand address another 5 it the second operand address
 The last 6 bits - operation result address
 Following instruction types supported
 addition
 add with carry
 subtraction
 multiplication
 division
 binary shifts
 comparison taking into account mark
 absolute value comparison
 transfer of control
 magnetic drum read
 stop
 RAM
 Flip-flop based
 Data and code separated
 31 machine words for data
 63 machine words for code
 ROM
 31 machine words for data
 63 machine words for code
 Clock rate
 5 kHz
 Performance
 About 3000 operations per minute (total time of one cycle is 17.6 ms; division operation takes from 17.6 to 20.8 ms)

Computer was built using 6000 vacuum tubes where about 3500 of triodes and 2500 of diodes. System occupies 60 m² (646 square feet) of space and uses about  25 kW of power.

Data was read from punched cards or typed using a plug switch. In addition, computer can use a magnetic drum that stores up to 5000 codes of numbers or commands.

An electromechanical printer or photo device was used for output.

See also
 History of computing in the Soviet Union

References

Soviet computer systems
One-of-a-kind computers
Vacuum tube computers
1950s computers
1950 in the Soviet Union